Adler und Falke was an NSDAP youth organization during the early "Time of Struggle".

Bibliography
Christian Zentner, Friedemann Bedürftig (1991). The Encyclopedia of the Third Reich. Macmillan, New York. 

Nazi Party organizations